The 1972 Canadian federal election was held on October 30, 1972, to elect members  of the House of Commons of Canada of the 29th Parliament of Canada.  It resulted in a slim victory for the governing Liberal Party, which won 109 seats, compared to 107 seats for the opposition Progressive Conservatives.  A further 48 seats were won by other parties and independents. On election night, the results appeared to give 109 seats to the Tories, but once the counting had finished the next day, the final results gave the Liberals a minority government and left the New Democratic Party led by David Lewis holding the balance of power.  See 29th Canadian parliament for a full list of MPs elected.

Overview
The election was the second fought by Liberal leader, Prime Minister Pierre Trudeau.  The Liberals entered the election high in the polls, but the spirit of Trudeaumania had worn off, and a slumping economy hurt his party.  The Tories were led by Robert Stanfield, the former premier of Nova Scotia, who had an honest but bumbling image. The Tories tried to capitalize on the public's perception that the Liberals were mismanaging the economy with the slogan, "A Progressive Conservative government will do better."

The Liberals campaigned on the slogan, "The Land is Strong", and television ads illustrating Canada's scenery.  The slogan quickly became much derided, and the party had developed few real issues to campaign on. As a result, their entire campaign was viewed as being one of the worst managed in recent decades.

Party platforms

Liberal Party:
 increase bilingualism in the Canadian civil service;
 re-introduce a bill controlling foreign take-overs of Canadian businesses;
 specialized programs to reduce unemployment;
 a program to expand and create new parks across Canada, including Toronto's "Harbourfront" and Mont-Sainte-Anne near Quebec City;
 make-work programs to create jobs;
 reduce abuse of Unemployment Insurance; and
 incentives to reduce pollution.

Progressive Conservative Party:
 increase the discipline in government spending, and increase the power of the Auditor General of Canada to fight waste and inefficiency in government;
 ban strikes in essential services;
 introduce price and wage controls if necessary to control inflation;
 require foreign-owned companies operating in Canada to have a majority of Canadians on their boards of directors;
 introduce an incentive to encourage Canadians to invest in small businesses;
 develop a national economic strategy in co-operation with the provincial governments;
 expand re-training opportunities for unemployed workers;
 adjust tariffs to encourage secondary processing in Canada of Canada's natural resources;
 eliminate the 11% sales tax on building materials;
 eliminate 3% increase in personal income tax rates scheduled for January 1, 1973, and reduce rates by 4% on July 1, 1973;
 adjust old age security payments regularly to reflect changes in the cost of living;
 index tax brackets to inflation so that taxes do not rise as the cost of living rises;
 provide assistance to set up residential land banks to reduce the cost of housing.

New Democratic Party:
 eliminate 3% increase in personal income tax rates scheduled for January 1, 1973, and reduce rates by 8% for ordinary Canadians;
 introduce controls on prices and rents, but not on wages;
 create a $430 million program to fund public works during winter months to reduce unemployment;
 increase old age security payments, but eliminate them for wealthy senior citizens;
 legislate greater autonomy for Canadian trade unions that are branches of international unions;
 tough tax laws for corporations;
 eliminate "corporate welfare", i.e., grants and subsidies for corporations, and use this money to build housing and transportation infrastructure, and fund municipal services to create jobs.

Social Credit Party:
 reform the monetary system in line with social credit theories;
 increase old age security payments to $200 per month beginning at age 60, and to $150 per month for spouses of seniors regardless of age.

National results
The voter turn-out was 76.7%.

One independent candidate was elected: Roch La Salle was re-elected in the Quebec riding of Joliette. La Salle had left the PC caucus to protest the party's failure to recognize what he considered Quebec's right to self-determination, and was the only candidate to win the support of the separatist Parti Québécois.

One candidate with no affiliation was elected: Lucien Lamoureux, in the Ontario riding of Stormont—Dundas—Glengarry. Lamoureux, originally elected as a Liberal, had been serving as Speaker of the House of Commons. He ran without affiliation in order to preserve his impartiality as Speaker. He retired after this Parliament, and did not run again in 1974.

The Liberals won a minority government, with the New Democratic Party, led by David Lewis, holding the balance of power. Requiring NDP support to continue, the Trudeau government would move left politically, including the creation of Petro-Canada.

This was the first of two elections in which Réal Caouette led the national Social Credit Party of Canada. Caouette, who had contested the previous two elections as leader of the breakaway Quebec-based Ralliement créditiste, had successfully taken over the leadership of the original western-based party and overseen the reintegration of the two factions. He successfully held on to the seats he had previously won under the RC banner, but these were the only ridings Social Credit managed to win as it continued to lose support outside Quebec.

Notes:

"% change" refers to change from previous election

1 Indicates increase from total Social Credit + Ralliement creditiste seats/vote in 1968.

2 Roch LaSalle, who was elected in 1968 as a Progressive Conservative, won re-election as an independent.

3 Lucien Lamoureux who was elected as a Liberal but served as Speaker of the House, won re-election with no party affiliation.

4 The Rhinoceros Party ran a total of 12 candidates, but because it was not recognized by Elections Canada as a registered party, its candidates were listed as independents.

Vote and seat summaries

Results by province

xx - less than 0.05% of the popular vote

See also
 
List of Canadian federal general elections
List of political parties in Canada
29th Canadian Parliament
Social Credit Party of Canada candidates, 1972 Canadian federal election

References

Party platforms

Further reading 
 

 
Federal
1972
Federal election